Sudan competed in the Summer Olympic Games for the first time at the 1960 Summer Olympics in Rome, Italy. Ten competitors, all men, took part in ten events in four sports.

Athletics

Men
Track & road events

Boxing

Men

Shooting

Three shooters represented Sudan in 1960.
Men

Weightlifting

Men

References

External links
Official Olympic Reports

Nations at the 1960 Summer Olympics
1960